James Lynch may refer to:

 James Lynch (archbishop of Tuam) (1623–1713), Irish Roman Catholic archbishop
 James Lynch (bishop of Kildare and Leighlin) (1807–1896), Irish Roman Catholic bishop
 James B. Lynch (died 1954), Irish Fianna Fáil Party politician, TD and Senator
 James Lynch (musician) (born 1979), guitarist with American punk rock band the Dropkick Murphys
 James Lynch (fitz Ambrose), mayor of Galway, 1590–1591
 James D. Lynch (1839–1872), first African-American Secretary of State of Mississippi
 James S. Lynch (1841–1894), Manitoba physician and political figure
 James Lynch (baseball) (1888–?), American Negro leagues baseball player
 James Lynch (criminologist) (born 1949), American criminologist
 James Lynch, a fictional character in the video game Kane & Lynch: Dead Men
 James Lynch (American football) (born 1999), American football defensive tackle
 James Daniel Lynch, American lawyer, judge and writer
 James Lynch (cartoonist) (born 1947), New Zealand cartoonist and conservationist

See also
 Jim Lynch (disambiguation)